The Khoisan Aboriginal and Others Movement  was a political party in South Africa. It was the first Khoisan party in South Africa and was launched in December 2008. It was led by Rodney January and sought to improve the livelihood of South Africa's San people.

References

2008 establishments in South Africa
Defunct political parties in South Africa
Indigenist political parties
Political parties established in 2008
Political parties with year of disestablishment missing